Génesis María Dávila Pérez (born November 18, 1990) is a Puerto Rican American model and beauty pageant titleholder. She won the Miss World Puerto Rico 2014 competition, where she represented Arroyo. She also represented Puerto Rico at Miss World 2014 in London. She was crowned Miss Florida USA 2017 but was disqualified for using outside assistance on hair and makeup.

Life and career

Early life
Dávila was born in Bayamón, Puerto Rico on November 18, 1990.

Pageantry

Puerto Rican titles

Miss Universe Puerto Rico 2013
On August 29, 2012, Dávila represented Arroyo at the Miss Universe Puerto Rico 2013 pageant. She ended up finishing as the first runner-up, and won the Best Legs Award. The winner of Miss Universe Puerto Rico 2013 was Monic Pérez, who represented the municipality of Arecibo. As first runner up, Dávila received the right to represent Puerto Rico at Miss Intercontinental 2012. She finished as the first runner-up, and won the title of Miss North America Intercontinental

Miss World 2014
On August 13, 2014, Dávila represented Arroyo at Miss World Puerto Rico 2014. She won the competition and also won the Beach Beauty Award. Dávila went on to represent Puerto Rico at Miss World 2014 in London, where she became the first woman of predominantly African heritage to represent Puerto Rico in Miss World but failed to place in the semifinals.

Miss Florida USA
Dávila represented Miami Beach in the Miss Florida USA 2017 pageant held on July 16, 2016. She ended up winning, and was crowned Miss Florida USA 2017 by outgoing titleholder Brie Gabrielle. Dávila was dethroned on July 22, 2016, after it was revealed that she hired outside hair and makeup professionals during the Miss Florida USA state pageant instead of doing the makeup herself, which is explicitly against pageant rules. The pageant stated they received multiple complaints from eyewitnesses and other contestants, in addition to it giving Dávila an unfair advantage. Dávila later filed a lawsuit against the owners of the Miss Florida USA pageant for $15 million, seeking damages for defamation and a restoration of her crown. The lawsuit was later dismissed in October, with its terms confidential. The following year, Dávila returned to Miss Florida USA, representing Miami, and won the competition yet again. She represented Florida at Miss USA 2018 and made the Top 5.

See also
 Miss Universe Puerto Rico 2013

References

External links
Missworld.com

1990 births
American beauty pageant winners
American people of Puerto Rican descent
Female models from Florida
Living people
Miss World 2014 delegates
People from Bayamón, Puerto Rico
People from Miami Beach, Florida
Puerto Rican beauty pageant winners
Puerto Rican female models
Miss USA 2018 delegates
People of Afro–Puerto Rican descent
21st-century African-American women
21st-century African-American people
Dávila